In mathematics, a Severi–Brauer variety over a field K is an algebraic variety V which becomes isomorphic to a projective space over an algebraic closure of K.  The varieties are associated to central simple algebras in such a way that the algebra splits over K if and only if the variety has a point rational over K.   studied these varieties,  and they are also named after Richard Brauer because of their close relation to the Brauer group.

In dimension one, the Severi–Brauer varieties are conics.  The corresponding central simple algebras are the quaternion algebras.  The algebra (a,b)K corresponds to the conic C(a,b) with equation 

and the algebra (a,b)K splits, that is, (a,b)K is isomorphic to a matrix algebra over K, if and only if C(a,b) has a point defined over K: this is in turn equivalent to C(a,b) being isomorphic to the projective line over K.

Such varieties are of interest not only in diophantine geometry, but also in Galois cohomology. They represent (at least if K is a perfect field) Galois cohomology classes in
H1(PGLn),
where PGLn
is the projective linear group, and n is the dimension of 
the variety V. There is a short exact sequence

1 → GL1 → GLn → PGLn → 1

of algebraic groups. This implies a connecting homomorphism

H1(PGLn) → H2(GL1)

at the level of cohomology. Here H2(GL1) is identified with the Brauer group of K, while the kernel is trivial because
H1(GLn) = {1}
by an extension of Hilbert's Theorem 90. Therefore, Severi–Brauer varieties can be faithfully represented by Brauer group elements, i.e. classes of central simple algebras.

Lichtenbaum showed that if X is a Severi–Brauer variety over K then there is an exact sequence

Here the map δ sends 1 to the Brauer class corresponding to X.

As a consequence, we see that if the class of X has order d in the Brauer group then there is a divisor class of degree d on X.  The associated linear system defines the d-dimensional embedding of X over a splitting field L.

See also 
projective bundle

Note

References

Further reading

External links
Expository paper on Galois descent (PDF)

Algebraic varieties
Diophantine geometry
Homological algebra
Algebraic groups
Ring theory